Richlea is a hamlet in Snipe Lake Rural Municipality No. 259, Saskatchewan, Canada. It previously held the status of a village until December 31, 1958.

History
Prior to December 31, 1958, Richlea was incorporated as a village, and was restructured as a hamlet under the jurisdiction of the rural municipality of Snipe Lake on that date.

See also

List of communities in Saskatchewan
List of hamlets in Saskatchewan

References

Snipe Lake No. 259, Saskatchewan
Former villages in Saskatchewan
Unincorporated communities in Saskatchewan